Bṣaīrā is one of the districts  of Tafilah governorate, Jordan.

References 

 

Districts of Jordan